The Textile Society of America (TSA) was founded in 1987 as an international non-profit educational organization for sharing and disseminating information about textiles and fiber media. The society sponsors a bi-annual conference where juried papers are presented on artistic, cultural, economic, historic, social and technical perspectives on textiles from around the world.

History 
Textile Society of America is a membership organization, governed by a volunteer board of directors from museums and universities in North America and administered by a small staff. Its approximately 700 members include curators, educators, historians, independent scholars, artists, journalists, students, dealers and collectors. Membership includes access to symposium proceedings along with a newsletter, membership directory and textile bibliography.

References

External links 
 

Textile arts organizations
Learned societies of the United States